The Protestant Methodist Church in Benin was founded by Methodist missionary and colonial official in West Africa, Thomas Birch Freeman in 1843.  He was sent by the Methodist Missionary Society in London.  Freeman was the son of a freed slave.

The Methodist Church in Benin is organised into 15 synods, and covers the whole country.  There are around 90,000 members in 420 congregations and 72 ordained pastors.

References

Methodism in Benin
Methodist denominations established in the 19th century
19th-century establishments in the Kingdom of Dahomey
1843 establishments in Africa